Víctor Hugo Merino Dubón (born August 18, 1979, in Apopa, El Salvador) is a former Salvadoran professional footballer.

Club career

FC Jazz
Merino signed his first professional contract at the age of 17 with Finnish team FC Jazz Pori. In Finland he is known by his maternal family name Dubón. Initially, the contract was for five years, but Merino struggled to accommodate himself with the change in climate and the Finnish language. As a result, he returned after four seasons.

Merino spent his first year in Finland with FC Jazz's junior team. The next season, he debuted in the Finnish top level, Veikkausliiga. Merino played total of 76 games in Veikkausliiga, scoring five goals. He also represented FC Jazz in 2001 UEFA Intertoto Cup as the club played against Gloria Bistriţa and Paris Saint-Germain.

Alianza FC
On his return to El Salvador, Merino signed with one of the countries biggest clubs in Alianza FC. His dribbling skills quickly made him a fan favourite, but his lack of consistency saw him transfer to San Salvador FC for the Apertura 2001.

San Salvador FC
At San Salvador FC, Merino began to excel and mature as a player. He was arguably the team's driving force in attack and helped them win the Clausura 2003 title, scoring one of their three goals at the final against Luis Ángel Firpo.

Luis Ángel Firpo
His great form saw him not only be selected into the national team, but also saw him gain the attention of another one of El Salvador's larger clubs in Luis Ángel Firpo, whom he signed for the following tournament after his title win with San Salvador FC. Here Merino continued to impress and was seen as one of the country's best creative attacking midfielders. Unfortunately for Merino, he suffered an injury in the Clausura 2005 and upon his return found it difficult to return to the high level of play that he had held for many years. Although he still produced moments of brilliance, he was not as consistent and he also failed to at times, play as part of a team.

FAS
His lack of form saw him once again transfer to another one of the Salvadoran giants of football in FAS. Here he saw limited playing time and as a result was transfer after one year to Águila.

Águila
This move not only meant a fresh start for Merino, but also saw him join the list of a select few players that have played for what are considered the "Big Four" clubs in the country (that being Alianza FC, Luis Ángel Firpo, FAS and Águila). Fortunately for Merino this move has seen to have suited him well as he has now become a regular starter and an important part of the team. Although his form is far from what it once was, he has lifted it to a level that many had not seen him play at for well over three years.

Return to Luis Ángel Firpo
In 2009, Merino signed again with Luis Ángel Firpo.

Isidro Metapán
Merino signed with Isidro Metapán for the Apertura 2013.

Sonsonate FC
In July 2015, Merino signed with Sonsonate FC.

Chalatenango
In 2017, Merino signed with Chalatenango for the Apertura 2017.

International career
Dubón received his first called up to the El Salvador national football team in 2003. He made his debut for the Cuscatlecos in a July 2004 friendly match against Guatemala and has earned a total of 20 caps, scoring 1 goal. He has represented his country in 4 FIFA World Cup qualification matches and played at the 2007 UNCAF Nations Cup as well as at the 2007 CONCACAF Gold Cup.

His final international match was a September 2007 friendly match against Ecuador.

International goals
Scores and results list El Salvador's goal tally first.

Honours

Club 
San Salvador FC
 Champion: Clausura 2003
 Runners-up: Apertura 2002

Luis Ángel Firpo
 Runners-up: Clausura 2005, Clausura 2007

FAS
 Runners-up: Apertura 2007, Clausura 2008

Isidro Metapán
 Apertura 2013, Clausura 2014, Apertura 2014
 Runners-up: Clausura 2015

References

External links
 Víctor Merino at Soccerway 

1979 births
Living people
People from San Salvador Department
Association football midfielders
Salvadoran footballers
El Salvador international footballers
2007 UNCAF Nations Cup players
2007 CONCACAF Gold Cup players
FC Jazz players
Alianza F.C. footballers
San Salvador F.C. footballers
C.D. Luis Ángel Firpo footballers
C.D. FAS footballers
C.D. Águila footballers
C.D. Atlético Marte footballers
Veikkausliiga players
Salvadoran expatriate footballers
Expatriate footballers in Finland
Salvadoran expatriate sportspeople in Finland